Samuel Chandanappally (13 May 1940 – 3 July 2000), who was born C. D. Samuel, was an Indian writer, college professor and orator.

In his lifetime, he wrote around 30 books in Malayalam.  His book titled Malankara Sabha Pithakkanmar, contains the study about the writings of the holy fathers of the Malankara Orthodox Syrian Church community and is considered a reference text.

Dr. Samuel Chandanappally collected most of the writings of Saint Gregorios of Parumala after a long period of research and published them with the title Holy writings (Pavithra Rachanakal) in 1980.

External links
 Distinct Faith and Unique Visions of St. Gregorios of Parumala
 Articles remembering Dr. Samuel Chandanappally

1940 births
2000 deaths
Malankara Orthodox Syrian Church Christians
Malayalam-language writers
People from Pathanamthitta district
20th-century Oriental Orthodox Christians
Writers from Kerala